Paphiopedilum purpuratum is a species of orchids found from southern China to Hainan Island. The species was discovered on Hong Kong Island in 1850.

This forest species is Critically Endangered in the wild, with an estimated global population of fewer than 250 individuals.  The main causes of ongoing decline are habitat loss and degradation.

References

purpuratum